Wenceslas Bojer (also Václav Bojer in Czech or Wenzel Bojer in German) (23 September 1795 in Řesanice, Bohemia, now the Czech Republic – 4 June 1856 in Port Louis, Mauritius) was a Czech naturalist, botanist and botanical illustrator.

Life
he was born to Simon Bojer and Barbara Staub.

Career
From 1813 till 1820 Bojer worked at the Imperial Museum Vienna. As a young man he was sent on expeditions to Africa and Mauritius by Franz Sieber. In 1821 he arrived at Mauritius. In 1822 the Mauritian governor Robert Townsend Farquhar sent him to Madagascar. He was accompanied by Malagasy Prince Rafaria who studied on Mauritius and James Hastie, a Scottish corporal and British envoy for King Radama I on Madagascar. Bojer explored the west coast of Madagascar before he arrived in Tananarive.

In 1824 Bojer was sent to Africa as an interpreter. He explored several coasts of the African continent and collected a huge amount of minerals and plants. In 1829 he was one of the co-founders of the Royal Society of Arts and Sciences (SRAS) at Mauritius.

He died of paralysis in 1856.

Many species of plants and animals (especially from Madagascar and the Mascarenes) were named after Bojer, including Gongylomorphus bojerii (Bojer's skink), Dionycha bojerii, Ploceus bojeri (golden palm weaver), Uapaca bojeri, Streptocarpus bojeri,  Epilobium bojeri, and many more.

References

Bibliography
WorldCat

External links

 (French)

 Bojer W. 1837. Hortus Mauritianus: ou énumération des plantes, exotiques et indigènes, qui croissent a l'Ile Maurice, disposées d'après la méthode naturelle. at the Biodiversity Heritage Library.

Czech botanists
Botanical illustrators
Mauritian scientists
1795 births
1856 deaths
British Mauritius people
People from Plzeň-South District